Home Run Showdown is a 2012 American family sports film directed by Oz Scott and starring Matthew Lillard and Dean Cain.

Plot

Cast
Matthew Lillard as Joey
Dean Cain as Rico
Annabeth Gish as Michelle
Barry Bostwick as Big Al
Wayne Duvall as Simpson
Stephanie Koenig as Aunt Janey Moore

Production
The film was shot in Fifth Third Field in Toledo, Ohio.

Reception
Tracy Moore of Common Sense Media awarded the film three stars out of five.

References

External links
 
 
 

American baseball films
Films shot in Ohio
Films directed by Oz Scott
2010s English-language films
2010s American films